Abramczyk (variously transliterated into other languages as: Abramczik, Abramcyk, Abramcik, Abramchik, Abramchyk, Abramtchik, Abramschik, Abramtshik, Abramtschik, Abrahmczyk, Abrahmcik, Abrahmchik, Abrahmtzik, Abramtzik, Abramčyk, Abramčik; , ; Hebrew: אברמציק, אברמצ'יק; Yiddish: אַבראַמטשיק; Arabic: ابرامسزيك) is a Slavic surname of distant Jewish origin, most predominantly coming from Poland, and nowadays met mainly among Polish Roman Catholics. It is a patronymic surname derived from a Hebrew name 'Abram' – the original name of the biblical 'Abraham'.

'Abramczyk' is claimed to be a surname of non-Ashkenazi origin (probably Sephardi or Mizrahi) given to the descendants of Jews from the Ottoman Empire. The latter names like this are referred to as 'Judeo-Slavic'.

The Polish-language ending 'czyk', originally diminutive, gradually became patronymic and therefore Abramczyk means "the son of Abram" (historically, "little Abram" or "Abram junior"). The surname is currently most common in Poland, however it also appears in other countries like Israel, France, the United States, Canada, Belarus, Belgium, Germany, Australia, the United Kingdom, Spain, Argentina and Brazil.

List of persons with the surname 
 Mikoła Abramchyk (1903–1970), Belarusian politician
 Halina Abramczyk (born 1951), Polish physicist and chemist
 Rüdiger Abramczik (born 1956), German football player and coach
 Volker Abramczik (born 1964), German football player
 Rabbi Noam Abramchik, American Rabbi, the director of a NCSY chapter of Jewish Learning Centre

Sport 
 Enea Abramczyk Astoria Bydgoszcz, Polish basketball team in Bydgoszcz, Poland, established in 1924

References

External links 
 Surname information in a Polish genealogical archive
 Abramczyk surname at the online Wiki dictionary (Polish)
 The surnames of Middle Eastern background list
 Worldwide statistics of Abramczyk last name at Forebears.io
 Abramczyk surname map at MyHeritage.com
 ABRAMCZYK last name at HebrewSurnames.com

Polish-language surnames
Jewish surnames
Yiddish-language surnames
Patronymic surnames